Keith Bradley Gordon (born January 22, 1969) is a former professional baseball player. He appeared in three games for the Cincinnati Reds of Major League Baseball (MLB) in its 1993 season.

Career
Born in Bethesda, Maryland, Gordon attended Walter Johnson High School. After that, he graduated from Wright State University, where he played for the Wright State Raiders baseball team. He was drafted by the Cincinnati Reds in the second round of the 1990 amateur draft. His Major League debut came on July 9, 1993 against the Pittsburgh Pirates. He went 1 for 4 in the game.

Besides, Gordon played minor league baseball through the 2002 season. He has since moved back to Clarksburg, Maryland, and currently is the head coach of the Varsity baseball team at the Bullis School in Potomac, Maryland. In addition, he serves as a baseball, basketball, and swimming instructor. Gordon is married and has one child.

Sources

External links
, or Retrosheet
Pelota Binaria (Venezuelan Winter League)

1969 births
Living people
African-American baseball players
American expatriate baseball players in Mexico
Atlantic City Surf players
Baseball players from Maryland
Billings Mustangs players
Bowie Baysox players
Cardenales de Lara players
American expatriate baseball players in Venezuela
Cedar Rapids Reds players
Charleston Wheelers players
Chattanooga Lookouts players
Cincinnati Reds players
Indianapolis Indians players
Langosteros de Cancún players
Major League Baseball left fielders
Mexican League baseball center fielders
Mexican League baseball left fielders
Nashua Pride players
New Haven Ravens players
New Jersey Jackals players
People from Bethesda, Maryland
Rochester Red Wings players
Saraperos de Saltillo players
Wright State Raiders baseball players
21st-century African-American people
20th-century African-American sportspeople